Efthimios "Efthimis" Rentzias (alternate spellings: Efthymios, Efthymis; Greek: Ευθύμιος "Ευθύμης" Ρεντζιάς; born January 11, 1976) is a retired Greek professional basketball player. During his pro club career, he was most notably a member of the Spanish League's FC Barcelona, and the NBA's Philadelphia 76ers. At a height of 2.12 m (6'11 ") tall, he played at the center position. He was inducted into the Greek Basket League Hall of Fame in 2022.

Professional career

Europe
Rentzias played his first club basketball with the amateur youth teams of Danaos Trikalon, a local team from Trikala, Greece. After that, he began his professional club career at the age of 17, with PAOK Thessaloniki of the Greek League, in the 1993–94 season. With PAOK, he won the championship of the now defunct European-wide third-level competition, the FIBA Korać Cup, in the 1993–94 season, and the Greek Cup title, in the 1994–95 season.

He later transferred to the Spanish ACB League club Barcelona Bàsquet, for the 1997–98 season. With Barcelona, Rentzias won his second FIBA Korać Cup championship, in the 1998–99 season. With Barcelona, he also won 2 Spanish League championships, in the 1998–99 and 2000–01 seasons. In his last year with Barcelona (2001–02), Rentzias averaged 9.2 points and 3.5 rebounds, in 17.3 minutes per game, in 51 games played, in both the Spanish League (ACB) and in Europe's premier club basketball competition, the EuroLeague. He shot 61.6 percent from the field, 36.3 percent from three-point range, and 71.4 percent from the foul line.

NBA
Rentzias was selected with the 23rd overall pick by the Denver Nuggets, in the 1996 NBA draft, while still under contract with PAOK. Rentzias opted not to play in the NBA at that time. On 29 September 1997, Rentzias' player draft rights were traded by the Denver Nuggets, along with a future 2000 2nd-round draft pick (Hanno Möttölä was later selected), to the Atlanta Hawks, in exchange for Priest Lauderdale. On 26 June 2002, Rentzias was traded by the Atlanta Hawks, to the Philadelphia 76ers, in exchange for a future 2004 2nd-round draft pick (Royal Ivey was later selected), and a future 2006 2nd-round draft pick (Daniel Gibson was later selected).

Rentzias then played in the NBA, with the 76ers, during the 2002–03 season. He played in 35 regular season games, and averaged 1.5 points per game. At that time, he was just the second Greek-born basketball player to have played for an NBA team. On 8 August 2003, Renztias was waived by the 76ers.

Return to Europe
After leaving the NBA, Rentzias subsequently played with Ülkerspor, of the Turkish Super League, Montepaschi Siena, of the Italian A League, and Forum Valladolid, of the Spanish ACB League. Rentzias had plans to come back to PAOK, where he wanted to finish his playing career. Unfortunately, in August 2006, he announced his retirement from playing pro club basketball at the age of 30, because of injury problems.

National team career

Greek junior national team
Rentzias was a part of the Greek junior national basketball teams. With Greece's junior national teams, he won the silver medal at the 1991 FIBA Europe Under-16 Championship and the gold medal at the 1993 FIBA Europe Under-16 Championship. Rentzias was named the MVP of the 1995 FIBA Under-19 World Cup, after he helped Greece to win the tournament's gold medal, scoring 33 points and grabbing 21 rebounds in the final against Australia. In the process, Greece beat (by a score of 98–78) an Under-19 U.S.A. Team that featured future NBA players like Vince Carter, Trajan Langdon, Stephon Marbury, and Samaki Walker. During that period of time, Rentzias was considered to be one of the most talented young European basketball players.

Greek senior national team
Rentzias was also a member of the senior men's Greek national team, from 1992 to 2003, and with Greece, he competed at the 1996 Atlanta Summer Olympic Games. At that time, that was the just the second ever appearance by Greece's senior men's basketball team in a Summer Olympic Games, and their first since the 1952 Helsinki Summer Olympic Games. He averaged 5.0 points and 4.1 rebounds, in 12 minutes per game, over seven games played in the 1996 Olympic Games tournament.

He also played with Greece at the following major FIBA tournaments: the 1994 FIBA World Championship, the 1995 EuroBasket, the 1997 EuroBasket, the 1998 FIBA World Championship, the 2001 EuroBasket, and the 2003 EuroBasket.

NBA career statistics

Regular season

|-
|-
| style="text-align:left;"| 
| style="text-align:left;"| Philadelphia
| 35 || 0 || 4.1 || 33.9 || 50.0 || 88.9 || 0.7 || 0.2 || 0.2 || 0.1 || 1.5
|- class="sortbottom"
| style="text-align:left;"| Career
| style="text-align:left;"|
| 35 || 0 || 4.1 || 33.9 || 50.0 || 88.9 || 0.7 || 0.2 || 0.2 || 0.1 || 1.5

.

Awards and accomplishments

Pro career
2× FIBA Korać Cup Champion: (1994, 1999)
Greek Cup Winner: (1995)
2× Greek League All-Star (1996 I, 1996 II)
2× Spanish League Champion: (1999, 2001)
Spanish Cup Winner: (2001)
Turkish Supercup Winner: (2003)
Turkish Cup Winner: (2004)
Italian Supercup Winner: (2004)
Greek Basket League Hall of Fame: (2022)

Greek junior national team
1991 FIBA Europe Under-16 Championship: 
1993 FIBA Europe Under-16 Championship: 
1995 FIBA Under-19 World Cup: 
1995 FIBA Under-19 World Cup: All-Tournament Team
1995 FIBA Under-19 World Cup: MVP

References

External links
 NBA.com profile
 Basketball-reference.com profile
 
 FIBA.com profile
 Euroleague.net profile
 Italian League profile 
 Spanish League profile 
 Hellenic Basketball Federation profile 

1976 births
Living people
1998 FIBA World Championship players
Basketball players at the 1996 Summer Olympics
CB Valladolid players
Centers (basketball)
Denver Nuggets draft picks
Greek expatriate basketball people in Italy
FC Barcelona Bàsquet players
Greek men's basketball players
Greek Basket League players
Greek expatriate basketball people in the United States
Greek expatriate basketball people in Spain
Greek expatriate basketball people in Turkey
Liga ACB players
Mens Sana Basket players
National Basketball Association players from Greece
Olympic basketball players of Greece
P.A.O.K. BC players
Philadelphia 76ers players
Basketball players from Trikala
Ülker G.S.K. basketball players
1994 FIBA World Championship players